The Obsidian Cliff Kiosk is a small structure that shelters an interpretive exhibit in Yellowstone National Park at Obsidian Cliff. The kiosk was built in 1931 as part of an effort to provide interpretive exhibits along the park's Grand Loop Road. In common with the Fishing Bridge Museum, Madison Museum and Norris Museum, the kiosk exemplifies the National Park Service Rustic style. The interpretive exhibit was designed by National Park Service's Carl Russell, who provided many other innovations in visitor experiences.

This is significant as the first "wayside exhibit" in the National Park system.

References

External links

Obsidian Cliff Kiosk at the Wyoming State Historic Preservation Office

Park buildings and structures on the National Register of Historic Places in Wyoming
Rustic architecture in Wyoming
Kiosks
Historic American Buildings Survey in Wyoming
National Register of Historic Places in Park County, Wyoming
National Register of Historic Places in Yellowstone National Park
1931 establishments in Wyoming
Cliff Kiosk
Buildings and structures in Yellowstone National Park in Wyoming